The Château de Rochebrune is an historic castle in Étagnac, Charente, France. It was built in the 11th and 12th centuries. It has been listed by the French Ministry of Culture since June 24, 1959.

References

Châteaux in Charente
Monuments historiques of Charente